The Mekelle shelling was a mass extrajudicial killing that took place in Mekelle (also transliterated as Maqallè) in the Tigray Region of Ethiopia during the Tigray War, on 28 November 2020. Mekelle is the regional capital of Tigray.

Massacre
The Ethiopian National Defense Force (ENDF) killed dozens of civilians during the assault on Mekelle on 28 November 2020. Tigray regional president Debretsion claimed that they were bombarding the city with artillery. Ambulances rushed through the streets picking up dead and wounded after Ethiopian government artillery strikes. Doctors in Mekelle sent text messages on the condition of anonymity to avoid reprisals from the government by using a rare internet connection in the city. They stated that indiscriminate artillery shelling targeted not only military areas, but also civilian neighborhoods, ended up killing 27 civilians (including a 4 year old child) and wounded around 100. The hospital staff provided pictures of their patients (including infants) having many shrapnel wounds.

Victims
The “Tigray: Atlas of the humanitarian situation” mentions 28 victims, of which one has been formally identified.

Reactions
The Ethiopian government denied bombarding the city with artillery.

References

External links
World Peace Foundation: Starving Tigray

Conflicts in 2020
Wars involving Eritrea
Wars involving Ethiopia
Massacres in 2020
2020 massacres of the Tigray War